Slidrefjord or Slidrefjorden is a lake that lies in Vestre Slidre Municipality (and the far northwestern end of the lake lies in Vang Municipality) in Innlandet county, Norway. The lake is not an actual fjord, just a lake that is part of the Begna river watershed.

The European route E16 highway runs along the northern shore of the lake.

See also
List of lakes in Norway

References

Vang, Innlandet
Lakes of Innlandet